Matthew Burton (8 February 1897 – 1940) was an English footballer who played in the Football League for Everton, New Brighton, Wrexham and Stoke.

Career
Burton was born in Grassmoor and played non-league football for local side Grassmoor Athletic before joining Everton just after World War I. However, he didn't stay long and joined Stoke where he spent the 1919–20 and 1920–21 season scoring once in eight league matches. He was released at the end and joined Wrexham where he scored 10 goals and went on to score six for  New Brighton. After ending his professional career with New Brighton Burton played for Welsh clubs Oswestry Town, Rhos Athletic, Llandudno and Connah's Quay & Shotton.

Career statistics
Source:

References

1897 births
1940 deaths
English footballers
Everton F.C. players
Stoke City F.C. players
Wrexham A.F.C. players
New Brighton A.F.C. players
Oswestry Town F.C. players
Llandudno F.C. players
Connah's Quay & Shotton F.C. players
English Football League players
People from Grassmoor
Footballers from Derbyshire
Association football forwards